Mario Borzic is a mixed martial artist. He competed in the Middleweight division.

Mixed martial arts record

|-
| Win
| align=center| 5-1
| Kamil Uygun
| KO (knee)
| Rings Holland: World's Greatest
| 
| align=center| 1
| align=center| 2:43
| Alytus, Alytus County, Lithuania
| 
|-
| Win
| align=center| 4-1
| Kees Ameur
| KO
| MTBN: Immortality
| 
| align=center| 1
| align=center| 0:00
| Amsterdam, North Holland, Netherlands
| 
|-
| Win
| align=center| 3-1
| Mujdat Deniz
| TKO (knees and punches)
| Rings Holland: The Untouchables
| 
| align=center| 1
| align=center| 3:20
| Utrecht, Netherlands
| 
|-
| Win
| align=center| 2-1
| Fred van Doesburg
| Decision (unanimous)
| Rings Holland: Who's The Boss
| 
| align=center| 2
| align=center| 5:00
| Utrecht, Netherlands
| 
|-
| Loss
| align=center| 1-1
| Tjerk Vermanen
| DQ
| FFH: Free Fight Gala
| 
| align=center| 0
| align=center| 0:00
| Beverwijk, North Holland, Netherlands
| 
|-
| Win
| align=center| 1-0
| Michael Jonker
| TKO (knee)
| Rings Holland: Utrecht at War
| 
| align=center| 1
| align=center| 0:00
| Utrecht, Netherlands
|

See also
List of male mixed martial artists

References

External links
 Mario Borzic at mixedmartialarts.com

Middleweight mixed martial artists
Living people
Year of birth missing (living people)